Jonathan Ward (born February 24, 1970) is an American actor. He has starred mostly in television series and television films, but has also appeared in a small number of feature films, including the critically maligned 1988 cult film Mac and Me. His acting debut was on Broadway as Michael in Peter Pan.

Early life
Ward was born in Elkridge, Maryland on February 24, 1970.

Career
Ward was 12 years old when he appeared in the 1982 telefilm Maid in America, his first on-screen acting role. His television credits include Charles in Charge, Heart of the City, The New Adventures of Beans Baxter, Beauty and the Beast, In the Heat of the Night, Parker Lewis Can't Lose, Grace Under Fire, The Twilight Zone, and the short-lived Who's the Boss spin-off Living Dolls. His film appearances include White Water Summer, Mac and Me, Steel Magnolias, FernGully: The Last Rainforest and Geronimo: An American Legend. He has written two documentaries and produced a documentary series titled Great Books. He retired in 2001.

Personal life
Since 1995, Ward and his wife Jamie have been co-owners of a repair and restoration shop called TLC: Toyota Land Cruisers in Van Nuys, California. The couple have two sons, Nash and Quinn.

References

External links

TLC Site

American male television actors
American male film actors
American male child actors
1970 births
Living people
Male actors from Maryland
20th-century American male actors
People from Elkridge, Maryland